Ian Davison is a British white supremacist and convicted terrorist.

Ian Davison may also refer to:
Ian Davison (cricketer) (1937–2017), English cricketer
Ian Davison (footballer) (born 1945), Australian footballer for South Melbourne

See also
Ian Davidson (disambiguation)